Jiršovci is a settlement in the Municipality of Destrnik in northeastern Slovenia. It lies in the hills surrounding the valley in the upper course of Rogoznica Creek, a minor left tributary of the Drava River. The area is part of the traditional region of Styria. The municipality is now included in the Drava Statistical Region.

A small chapel-shrine in the settlement dates to the late 19th century.

References

External links
Jiršovci on Geopedia

Populated places in the Municipality of Destrnik